Hârtop or Hîrtop may refer to several places in Romania:

Hârtop, Suceava, a commune in Suceava County
 Hârtop, a village in Bârgăuani Commune, Neamț County

and in Moldova:

Hîrtop, Cimișlia, a commune in Cimișlia District
Hîrtop, Transnistria, a commune in Transnistria
Hîrtop, a village in Plopi Commune, Cantemir District
Hîrtop, a village in Scumpia Commune, Fălești District
Hîrtop, a village in Ghindești Commune, Florești District
Hîrtop, a village in Băiuș Commune, Leova District
Hîrtop, a village in Albota de Jos Commune, Taraclia District
Hîrtop, a village in Pistruieni Commune, Telenești District